Friern Barnet  is a suburban area within the London Borough of Barnet,  north of Charing Cross. Its centre is formed by the busy intersection of Colney Hatch Lane (running north and south), Woodhouse Road (taking westbound traffic towards North Finchley) and Friern Barnet Road (leading east towards New Southgate).

History

Friern Barnet was an ancient parish in the Finsbury division of Ossulstone hundred, in the county of Middlesex. 

The area was originally considered to be part of Barnet, most of which was in Hertfordshire. By the 13th century the Middlesex section of Barnet was known as Little Barnet, before becoming Frerenbarnet and then Friern Barnet (sometimes spelt in other ways, such as "Fryern Barnett"). The "Friern" part of the parish's name derives from the French for "brother" and refers to the medieval lordship of the Brotherhood or Knights of the Hospital of St John of Jerusalem.

Friern Barnet was mainly rural until the 19th century. The opening of Colney Hatch paupers' lunatic asylum in 1851, and of railway stations on the Great Northern and Metropolitan Railways, also in the mid-19th century, prompted its development as an outer London suburb. This process was accelerated by the arrival of electric trams in the 1900s.

Local affairs were administered by the parish vestry until 1875, when it was grouped with neighbouring parishes as part of Barnet Rural Sanitary District. In response to a petition by local ratepayers who wished the area to be removed from the Barnet RSD, the parish adopted the Local Government Act 1858 and formed a local board of health of nine members in 1883. Under the Local Government Act 1894 the local board's area became the Friern Barnet Urban District. In 1965 it became part of the London Borough of Barnet.

Notable people

In order of birth:
 Lawrence Campe (died 1613), draper and citizen of the City of London, funded the building of almshouses in "Fryan Barnett".
 Charlotte Maria Tucker (1821–1893), pseudonym A.L.O.E. (A Lady of England), was born at Friern Hatch. She was a prolific writer and poet for children and adults, who tempered her didactic Evangelicalism with realistic depictions of the poor.
 Wilfred Kitching (1893–1977), 7th General of the Salvation Army, was educated at Friern Barnet Grammar School.
 Dorothy Lawrence (1896–1964), a reporter who posed as a man to join the army in World War I, was later confined in Colney Hatch Lunatic Asylum (latterly Friern Hospital), where she died.
 Jack Cohen, founder of the Tesco retail chain, funded with his wife the Jewish care facility Lady Sarah Cohen House in Friern Barnet.
 Hazel Alden Reason (1901–1976), chemist and popular science writer, was born in Friern Barnet.
 H. G. H. Kearns (1902–1986), an entomologist with a strong knowledge of engineering, was born in Friern Barnet.
 Cyril Fletcher (1913–2005), comedian and actor, was educated at Woodhouse Grammar School.
 Colin Pearson (1923–2007), a studio potter and art teacher, was born in Friern Barnet.
 Edgar Mann (1926–2013), a politician who chaired the Executive Council of the Isle of Man and then headed its government, was educated at Woodhouse Barnet Grammar School.
 John Williams (born 1941), classical guitarist, was educated at Friern Barnet Grammar School
 Václav Jelínek (born 1944), Czech spy who was arrested in his flat in Friern Barnet on 22 April 1988, while in the process of receiving coded messages by radio.
 Neil 'Roberto' Williams (born 1978), a radio and TV presenter, was educated at Friern Barnet Grammar School.
 Girls Aloud pop group who resided at Princess Park Manor.

Housing
The housing typically consists of late Victorian and early Edwardian properties, along with other large houses of later periods and many smaller semi-detached and terraced houses. Much of the property is owner-occupied, but in recent years many of the larger properties have been subdivided into flats and bedsitters. There are also some areas of modern housing, notably Princess Park Manor, a luxury redevelopment of the once-famous Victorian institution the Colney Hatch Lunatic Asylum (later Friern Hospital).

Friern Village
Adjacent to Princess Park Manor is a modern housing development called Friern Village. This was once the area farmed by the Colney Hatch Hospital residents. In 1998 the newly formed local residents' association held a ballot among the new residents to find a name for this new area. The name Friern Village was chosen and subsequently the residents' association changed its name to the Friern Village Residents' Association. A new public park in front of Princess Park Manor, in Friern Barnet Road, was named Friern Village Park.

Economy

The Friern Barnet Retail Park near the North Circular Road houses several retailers including Currys PC World, B&Q and Furniture Village.

Geography

Parks and open spaces

Friern Barnet is a leafy suburb of private gardens and trees and Friary Park. The area includes the North Middlesex Golf Club, whose main entrance is at the Whetstone end of Friern Barnet Lane, and Coppetts Wood nature reserve, a medium-sized green area of rare plants and wildlife including some types of small bat and Great Crested Newts.

Architecture
The Church of England parish church of St John The Evangelist in Friern Barnet Road is Grade II* listed.

Friern Barnet Town Hall in Friern Barnet Lane was built in 1939–41 to a design by Sir John Brown and A. E. Henson. The design owes much to that of Watford Town Hall, whose architect (Charles Cowles-Voysey) had played a pivotal role in judging the design competition. English Heritage lists it as "a good example of pared-down modernism... [whose] subtle form and pronounced sense of civic pride mark it out as an exceptional civic building, on this scale, of its day."

Education

Local schools and colleges include Coppetts Wood Primary School, Friern Barnet School, Dwight School London (being the former Friern Barnet Grammar School), The Compton School, Woodhouse College, St John's CE Primary School, Holly Park Primary School and the Wren Academy.

Transport
The North Circular Road bisects the southern part. The nearest London Underground stations are Arnos Grove and Finchley Central. The nearest National Rail station is New Southgate. The area is served by London Buses routes 34, 43, 134, 221, 232, 234, 382, 634 and 683.

Local newspapers
The local newspapers are as of 2011:

See also
 Friern Barnet & District Local History Society

References

External links

Friern Barnet Photo Archive
The Barnet Society
Friern Barnet & District Local History Society

 
Districts of the London Borough of Barnet
Places formerly in Middlesex